Julius of Taranto, also known as Julius of Tarent, is a dramatic tragedy by Johann Anton Leisewitz. Published in 1774, it is a notable work of the Sturm und Drang era. The play was a favourite of Friedrich Schiller and much acted in Germany. Its central theme is the struggle between the two princes Julius and Guido of Taranto (Tarent in German) for the affections of commoner Blanca.

Like in Klinger's Die Zwillinge, "a dynamic but frustrated man of action," Guido, "is opposed to a more pacific, melancholy figure," Julius.

The Encyclopædia Britannica describes the play as the forerunner of Friedrich Schiller's famous Sturm und Drang masterpiece The Robbers (1781).

Roles 
 Constantin, the Prince of Tarent and father of Julius and Guido
 Julius, Hereditary Prince of the Principality of Tarent
 Guido, his younger brother
 Archbishop of Tarent, the brother of Constantin
 Cäcilia Nigretti, Countess and niece of Constantin
 Blanca, a commoner and Julius' sweetheart
 Count Aspermonte, friend and und confidant of Julius
 Abbess of monastery
 Doctor
 Supporting characters

Literature 
 Walther Kühlhorn: J. A. Leisewitzens Julius von Tarent. Erläuterung und literarhistorische Würdigung. Walluf 1973.
 Dramen des Sturm und Drang. Reclam 1997.
 Stefanie Wenzel: Das Motiv der feindlichen Brüder im Drama des Sturm und Drang. Frankfurt 1993.
 Ines Kolb: Herrscheramt und Affektkontrolle. Johann Anton Leisewitz’ „Julius von Tarent“ im Kontext von Staats- u. Moralphilosophie der Aufklärung. Frankfurt 1983
 Johann Anton Leisewitz: Julius von Tarent und die dramatischen Fragmente. Heilbronn 1889

References 

1774 plays
Romanticism
Sturm und Drang